The RATP bus network covers the entire territory of the city of Paris and the vast majority of its near suburbs.
Operated by the Régie Autonome des Transports Parisiens (RATP), this constitutes a dense bus network complementary to other public transport networks, all organized and financed by Île-de-France Mobilités.

Other suburban bus lines are managed by private operators grouped in a consortium known as Optile, an association of 80 private bus operators holding exclusive rights on their lines. There are approximately 9500 buses serving public transportation across the Paris region, all operators included.

Network 

RATP operates:

 70 lines with a route exclusively or mainly on the territory of the city of Paris including :
 the  line completing (with   ) a circular transport service surrounding Paris's borders along the Boulevards des Maréchaux ;
 194 lines with a route exclusively or mainly in the near suburbs of Paris including:
 a dozen lines (numbered in the 400 series) subcontracted by local public transport companies belonging to the Optile group ;

 several "urban" line services numbered in the 500 series but generally designated by a trade name, covering small suburban shuttle services and often subsidized by covered cities ;
2 direct bus lines from Paris to CDG and ORY airports :  &  
the "Opentour" tourist lines ;

 the lines of the "Titus" and "Valouette" networks ;
 32 night shift lines (including two subcontracted) grouped in the Noctilien night bus network.

Routes 

RATP bus lines operating mainly in the city proper of Paris, are named with a two-digit code number called "indice". Bus lines operated mainly in the suburbs are named with a three-digit number code.

All this according to an organized scheme used since public transportation reorganization post-WWII.

The first digit represents the sector in Paris where the line's starting point is located:
 2x representing Gare Saint-Lazare
 3x representing Gare de l'Est
 4x representing Gare du Nord
 5x representing Opéra and overall Rive Droite
 6x representing Austerlitz or Gare de Lyon train stations
 7x represents Châtelet and overall Center of Paris (along Rivoli Street)
 8x represents Quartier Latin and overall Rive Gauche
 9x represents Gare Montparnasse.

The digit number represents the outermost arrondissement the line finishes (or crosses Paris' borders) in:

 x2 represents the 16th arrondissement (from Pont du Garigliano to Porte Maillot)
 x3 and x4 represent the 17th arrondissement (from Porte Maillot to Porte d'Asnières for lines ending in 3, from Porte de Clichy to Porte des Poissonniers for lines ending in 4)
 x5 represents the 18th arrondissement and the 19th arrondissement (from Porte de la Chapelle to Porte des Lilas)
 x6 represents the 20th arrondissement and the 12th arrondissement (from Porte de Bagnolet to Porte de Charenton)
 x7 represents the 13th arrondissement (from Quai d'Ivry to Cité Universitaire)
 x8 represents the 14th arrondissement (from Montsouris to Porte de Vanves)
 x9 represents the 15th arrondissement (from Porte de Vanves to Pont du Garigliano)

0 and 1 are used as "wildcards" for lines whose rightful indice is already taken, or for lines ending inside of Paris (40 or 91 for example).

A deep reorganization of the Paris bus network took place on April the 20th 2019. Although it didn't change the overall scheme mentioned above, it brought several irregularities, such as lines   &  no longer starting from Saint Lazare train station while brand new line  doesn't even approach it, line  now cut long before the Gare de l'Est, line  that doesn't even approach the Gare du Nord, or lines  &  that do not start from the center of Paris.

Bus services

RATP operates 70 bus lines within the city of Paris proper, and a little over 200 bus lines in Paris suburbs.

In 2017, 1.15 billion journeys were made on RATP bus lines, including 382 million journeys on Paris lines and 768 million journeys on suburbs lines.

Paris buses

Airport direct shuttle buses

Suburban buses

Night buses (Noctilien)

Special and circular bus lines

Special and circular bus lines in Paris

Special and circular bus lines in suburbs

References

External links
 RATP Web site with complete maps
 KML map showing stop locations
 Grand Paris des Bus

Transport infrastructure in Île-de-France
Bus transport in France
RATP Group